Abakada... Ina is a 2001 Filipino drama movie, directed by Eddie Garcia and written by Shaira Mella Salvador.

Plot 
The story revolved around an illiterate mother named Estella (Lorna Tolentino) who married a man Daniel (Albert Martinez), who had 3 beautiful daughters. Since Estella stopped studying, she had been arguing with her mother-in-law Matilda (Nida Blanca). Matilda loves her grandchildren very much, and as much as possible, she didn't want them to become like their mother. She even brainwashed them to be ashamed of their own mother. Their real mother, Estella, however, felt out of place.

Cast 
 Lorna Tolentino as Estella
 Albert Martinez as Daniel
 Nida Blanca as Matilda
 Alicia Alonzo as Miling
 Bobby Andrews as Jojo
 Joanne Quintas as Amy
 Matet de Leon as Gina
 Aiza Marquez as Beth

Sources 

2001 films
Philippine drama films